The Honduran Amateur League (Liga Amateur de Honduras in Spanish) was the top-level football league in Honduras from its foundation in 1947 until 1964 when the Liga Nacional was formed.

Teams

Champions

Titles by club

See also
 Liga Nacional de Fútbol Profesional de Honduras
 Francisco Morazán Major League

References

Liga Amateur de Honduras
Amateur League
Amateur League